The Pulitzer Prizes for 2007 were announced on April 16, 2007.

In November 2006, the Pulitzer Prize Board announced two changes that would apply to the 2007 awards:

"online elements will be permitted in all journalism categories except for the competition's two photography categories, which will continue to restrict entries to still images."
a "category called Local Reporting will replace Beat Reporting as one of the 14 prizes in journalism"; the board explained that "while the local category replaces the Beat Reporting category that was created in 1991, the work of beat reporters remains eligible for entry in a wide range of categories that include—depending on the specialty involved— national, investigative, and explanatory reporting, as well as the new local category."

Journalism

Letters, Drama and Music Awards

Special Citations
 Ray Bradbury received an extraordinary citation "for his distinguished, prolific and deeply influential career as an unmatched author of science fiction and fantasy."
 John Coltrane received an extraordinary posthumous citation "for his masterful improvisation, supreme musicianship and iconic centrality to the history of jazz."

References

External links
 
 "2007 Pulitzer Prizes for Journalism". The New York Times.
 "2007 Pulitzer Prizes for Letters, Drama and Music". The New York Times.

Pulitzer Prizes by year
Pulitzer Prize
Pulitzer Prize, 2007
Pulitzer Prize, 2007